The Z1086 or   Sitakunda (Baroirdala)–Hazarikhil-Fatikchhari (Haidchakia) Road is a transportation artery in Bangladesh, which connects Dhaka–Chittagong Highway from Baroirdala (Sitakunda) with Regional Highway R160 at Pelaghazi Dighi.

Junction list

The entire route is in Chittagong District.

Markets crossed
 Hazarikhil
 Noyahat

See also
 N1 (Bangladesh)

References

National Highways in Bangladesh